Satyavir Tyagi is an Indian politician and a member of 17th Legislative Assembly of Noida, Uttar Pradesh of India. He represents the Kithore constituency of Uttar Pradesh and is a member of the Bharatiya Janata Party.

Political career
Satyavir Tyagi has been a member of the 17th Legislative Assembly of Uttar Pradesh. Since 2017, he has represented the Kithore constituency and is a member of the BJP. He was candidate of 16th Legislative Assembly of Uttar Pradesh KITHORE ASSEMBLY SEAT for RLD in 2012.

Posts held

See also
Uttar Pradesh Legislative Assembly

References

Uttar Pradesh MLAs 2017–2022
Bharatiya Janata Party politicians from Uttar Pradesh
Living people
Year of birth missing (living people)